Google Question Hub (GQH) is a knowledge market platform developed and offered by Google. As part of reducing non-existent digital media backlog, it uses various but not-known search algorithms to collect unanswered web search queries for content creators, including journalists. GQH is accessible via a registered Google search console account with a verified web property as contradict to Google Questions and Answers.  However, searchers  do not need to be registered with search console except a google account.

As of September 2021, it is a beta product and is limited to the United States, India, Indonesia, and Nigeria. Google search users ask a question in specified languages such as English, Hindi and Indonesian language, and after collecting the unanswered questions, Google lists them in GQH where publishers can then use them as the basis for new publishing articles.

History
In 2019, Google Question Hub was initially released in beta version and available in India, Indonesia, and Nigeria. , it was first reported by the news media in late 2019. The actual launch date is not known.

References

Question Hub
Internet properties established in 2019
Knowledge markets